Azizullah Royesh (known as Aziz Royesh) is a Hazara, social activist, teacher and writer from Afghanistan.

Biography 
Aziz Royesh was born in 1969 in Fazel Baig, Kabul, Afghanistan. After leaving school at age 10, he travelled to Ghazni Province before moving to Quetta, Pakistan alone at age 11. Because Royesh had no family in Quetta, he worked in tailor shops, bakeries, and small factories to support himself. Unable to continue his formal education, he continued to study what he could on his own outside his work. 

At the age of 16, he returned to Afghanistan and established five schools in Ghazni province. With the reemergence of the Taliban in 1994, he returned to Pakistan and established the Marefat High School for Afghanistani Refugees in Pakistan. After the fall of the Taliban in 2001, Marefat High School was transferred to Kabul's Dashte Barchi while a branch in Pakistan remained open.

The Marefat School and Royesh are subjects of a non-fiction work, "The Last Thousand: One School's Promise in a Nation at War" (2016) by American writer Jeffrey E. Stern.

Best Teacher in the World 
In 2015 he was nominated the Best Teacher of the Year in the world.

Publications 
 A book in Dari language,

See also 
 List of Hazara people

References

External links 
 
 www.afghan-bios.info
 worldfellows.yale.edu/Azizullah Royesh

Hazara writers
Hazara politicians
People from Kabul
1970 births
Living people